This article provides details of international football games played by the Zambia national football team from 2020 to present.

Results

2020

2021

2022

Forthcoming fixtures
The following matches are scheduled:

See also 
 Zambia women's national football team results

References

 
Results (2020–present)